Elpistostegalia or Panderichthyida is an order of prehistoric lobe-finned fishes which lived during the Middle Devonian to Late Devonian period (about 385 to 374 million years ago). They represent the advanced tetrapodomorph stock, the fishes more closely related to tetrapods than the osteolepiform fishes. The earliest elpistostegalians, combining fishlike and tetrapod-like characters, are sometimes called fishapods, a phrase coined for the advanced elpistostegalian Tiktaalik. Through a strict cladistic view, the order includes the terrestrial tetrapods.

Palaeobiology of the elpistostegalians
A rise in global oxygen content allowed for the evolution of large, predatory fish that were able to exploit the shallow tidal areas and swamplands as top predators. Several groups evolved to fill these niches, the most successful were the elpistiostegalians. In such environments, they would have been challenged by periodic oxygen deficiency.  In comparable modern aquatic environments like shallow eutrophic lakes and swampland, modern lungfish and some genera of catfish also rely on the more stable, atmospheric source of oxygen.

Being shallow-water fishes, the elpistostegalians evolved many of the basic adaptions that later allowed the tetrapods to become terrestrial animals. The most important ones were the shift of main propulsion apparatus from the tail fin to the pectoral and pelvic fins, and a shift to reliance on lungs rather than gills as the main means of obtaining oxygen. Both of these appear to be a direct result of moving to an inland freshwater mode of living.

The elpistostegalians gave rise to the tetrapods in the Eifelian (early middle Devonian) around 395 million years ago.  While the early tetrapods flourished and diversified over the next 30 million years, the non-tetrapod elpistostegalians disappear from the fossil record fairly quickly in the early Frasnian around 380 million years ago, leaving the tetrapods the sole survivors of their line.

Traits
Paleontologist and professor Per E. Ahlberg has identified the following traits as synapomorphic for Elpistostegalia (and thus Tetrapoda):

 The endocranium is hinged, the hinge forming the profundus nerve foramen. The cranial kinesis is also visible in the skull roof, between the parietal bones and the postparietal bones.
 A rather small shoulder girdle is present.
 The anal and posterior dorsal fin supported by a basal plate and three unjointed radials.
 The pectoral fin skeleton is composed of bones homologous to the tetrapod humerus, ulna, and radius, followed by a host of smaller bones anchoring the fin rays; the pelvic fin skeleton similarly has femur, tibia, and fibula.

Phylogeny
The name, originally coined around the genus Elpistostege, later become a synonym for Panderichthyida. In most analyses, the group as traditionally imagined is actually an evolutionary grade, the last "fishes" of the tetrapod stem line, though Chang and Yu (1997) treated them as the sister clade to Tetrapoda. Elpistostegalia was re-defined as a clade containing Panderichthys and tetrapods.

Below is a cladogram from Swartz, 2012.

References

Prehistoric lobe-finned fish
Prehistoric fish orders
Elpistostegalians
Late Devonian animals
Late Devonian fish
Devonian bony fish